The 2020–21 Michigan State Spartans women's basketball team represented Michigan State University during the 2020–21 NCAA Division I women's basketball season. The Spartans, led by fourteenth year head coach Suzy Merchant, played their home games at the Breslin Center in East Lansing, Michigan as members of the Big Ten Conference.

They finished the season 15–9, 8–7 in Big Ten play to finish in eighth place.  As the seventh seed in the Big Ten tournament they defeated Penn State in the Second Round and Indiana in the Quarterfinals before losing to Iowa in the Semifinals.  They received and at-large bid to the NCAA tournament where they were the ten seed in the Mercado Regional.  They lost in the first round to seven seed Iowa State to end their season.

Previous season 

The Spartans finished the season 16–14, 9–9 in Big Ten play to finish in eighth place.  In the Big Ten tournament they lost to Purdue in the first round.  They did not get a chance for further post season play, as the NCAA women's basketball tournament and WNIT were cancelled before they began due to the COVID-19 pandemic.

Roster

Schedule and results

Source:

|-
!colspan=6 style=| Regular season

|-
!colspan=6 style=|Big Ten tournament

|-
!colspan=6 style=|NCAA tournament

Rankings

The Coaches Poll did not release a Week 2 poll and the AP Poll did not release a poll after the NCAA Tournament.

See also
2020–21 Michigan State Spartans men's basketball team

References

Michigan State
Michigan
Michigan
Michigan State Spartans women's basketball seasons
Michigan State